Douvillinidae is an extinct family of prehistoric brachiopods in the extinct superfamily Strophomenoidea. The type genus is Douvillina.

References

External links 

 Douvillinidae at fossilworks.org

Prehistoric protostome families
Brachiopod families
Strophomenida
Ordovician first appearances